The Peary caribou (Rangifer arcticus pearyi) is a subspecies of caribou found in the High Arctic islands of Nunavut and the Northwest Territories in Canada. In length the females average  and the males .

Like other caribou, both the males and females have antlers. The males grow their antlers from March to August and the females from June to September, and in both cases the velvet is gone by October. The coat of the caribou is white and thick in the winter. In the summer it becomes short and darker, almost slate-grey in color. The coat is made up of hollow hair which helps to trap warmer air and insulate the caribou.

The males become sexually mature after two years and the females after three years. Breeding is in the fall and depends on the female having built up sufficient fat reserves. The gestation period last for seven to eight months and one calf is produced.

Peary caribou feed on most of the available grasses, Cyperaceae (sedges), lichen and mushrooms. In particular they seem to enjoy the purple saxifrage and in summer their muzzles become purple from the plants. Their hooves are sharp and shaped like a shovel to enable them to dig through the snow in search of food.

They are able to outrun the Arctic wolf, their main predator, and are good swimmers. They usually travel in small groups of no more than twelve in the summer and four in the winter.

The Peary caribou population has dropped from above 40,000 in 1961 to an estimated 13,000 adults in 2016, according to the Committee on the Status of Endangered Wildlife in Canada (COSEWIC). During this period, the number of days with above freezing temperatures has increased significantly, resulting in ice layers in the snow pack. These ice layers hinder foraging and are the likely cause for dramatic drops in caribou population in the future.

The Peary caribou, called tuktu in Inuinnaqtun/Inuktitut, and written as ᕐᑯᑦᓯᑦᑐᒥ ᑐᒃᑐ in Inuktitut syllabics, is a major food source for the Inuit and was named after the American explorer Robert Peary.

Morphology

Pelage 
During the winter, the fur of the Peary caribou becomes thicker and whiter. In the summer it is shorter and darker. The pelage of the Peary caribou is white in winter and slate-grey with white legs and underparts in summer like the barren-ground caribou in the Dolphin-Union caribou herd. The Dolphin-Union caribou are slightly darker.

Like all caribou the hollow hairs help trap warm air and insulate their bodies.

Antlers 
The Peary caribou and the Dolphin-Union caribou herd both have light slate-grey antler velvet. The antler velvet of the barren-ground caribou and the boreal woodland caribou are both dark chocolate brown.

Habitat 
The Peary caribou may move seasonally up to  each way, not necessarily on fixed migration routes that are used habitually, but rather broad migration zones that individuals use to travel from winter ranges to calving areas and summer ranges. They occupy High Arctic islands, including Banks Island, the northwest corner of Victoria Island, Prince of Wales Island, Somerset Island and the Queen Elizabeth Islands. In summer they search for the richest vegetation which is found "on the upper slopes of river valleys and uplands." In the winter, they "inhabit areas where the snow is not too deep such as rugged uplands, beach ridges and rocky outcrops."

Aulavik National Park at the northern end of Banks Island is also home to the Peary caribou. The Thomsen River runs through the park and is the northernmost navigable river (by canoe) in North America. In Inuvialuktun Aulavik means "place where people travel" and caribou have been hunted there for more than 3,400 years, from Pre-Dorset cultures to contemporary Inuvialuit.

Archaeologists have found bones of pearyi-sized caribou that occupied Greenland in the Illinoian-Wisconsin interglacial and through the LGM and early Holocene (Meldgaard 1986).  Degerbøl (1957) described R. t. eogroenlandicus, a small caribou that  became extinct about 1900, from a relict enclave in north-eastern Greenland (Fig. 2). However, Anderson (1946) thought that the small caribou that were occasionally found in northwest Greenland were Peary caribou and implied the same for east Greenland caribou. Bennike (1988), comparing bones and noting that Peary caribou have been documented crossing Nares Strait to Greenland, doubted that pearyi and eogroenlandicus were subspecifically distinct. That Peary caribou shared certain mtDNA haplotypes and morphological similarities with it (Kvie et al. 2016) casts further doubt on the validity of R. t. eogroenlandicus. Inuit Qaujimajatuqangit (traditional or community knowledge) records that Peary caribou do, occasionally, cross to Greenland. In any case, the last live caribou reported from northern Greenland were most likely Peary caribou that had strayed from Ellesmere Island. They were last seen in Hall Land in 1922.<ref>Morten Meldgaard, (1986) The Greenland Caribou - Zoogeography, Taxonomy, and Population Dynamics,  p. 44</ref>

 Conservation 
It was assigned a status of threatened in April 1979. In May 2004 the Committee on the Status of Endangered Wildlife in Canada (COSEWIC) listed the Peary caribou as endangered. In 2015, COSEWIC returned the status to threatened, noting:

 Taxonomy 
Originally named Rangifer pearyi Allen, 1902, it was made a subspecies of barren-ground caribou in 1960 as R. arcticus pearyi. When all caribou and reindeer in the world were made conspecific, the name became R. tarandus pearyi. A recent revision returned the name to R. arcticus pearyi.

See also
Caribou herds and populations in Canada

Footnotes

 References 

 
  Peary Caribou – Endangered; Barren-Ground Caribou (Dolphin and Union Population) –Special Concern.
 
 

  
 
  

Further reading

 Larter, Nicholas C, and John A Nagy. 2001. "Variation between Snow Conditions at Peary Caribou and Muskox Feeding Sites and Elsewhere in Foraging Habitats on Banks Island in the Canadian High Arctic". Arctic, Antarctic, and Alpine Research. 33, no. 2: 123.
 Maher, Andrew Ian. Assessing Snow Cover and Its Relationship to Distribution of Peary Caribou in the High Arctic. Ottawa: Library and Archives Canada = Bibliothèque et Archives Canada, 2006. 
 Manning, T. H. The Relationship of the Peary and Barren Ground Caribou. Montreal: Arctic Institute of North America, 1960.
 Miller, F. L., E. J. Edmonds, and A. Gunn. Foraging Behaviour of Peary Caribou in Response to Springtime Snow and Ice Conditions. [Ottawa]: Environment Canada, Canadian Wildlife Service, 1982. 
 Northwest Territories. (2001). NWT peary caribou Rangifer tarandus pearyi. NWT species at risk fact sheets. [Yellowknife]: Northwest Territories Resources, Wildlife and Economic Development.
 Tews, Joerg, Michael A D Ferguson, and Lenore Fahrig. 2007. "Potential Net Effects of Climate Change on High Arctic Peary Caribou: Lessons from a Spatially Explicit Simulation Model". Ecological Modelling''. 207, no. 2: 85.

External links
 

Reindeer
Mammals of the Arctic
Caribou, Peary
Mammals of Canada
Endemic fauna of Canada